The Cabal ministry or the CABAL  refers to a group of high councillors of King Charles II of England, Scotland and Ireland from 1668 to .

The term Cabal has a double meaning in this context. It refers to the fact that, for perhaps the first time in English history, effective power in a royal council was shared by a group of men, a cabal, rather than dominated by a single "favourite". The term also serves as the acronym "C-A-B-A-L"  for the names of the five Privy Councillors (Clifford, Arlington, Buckingham, Ashley, and Lauderdale) who formed the council's Committee for Foreign Affairs.

Through the Foreign Affairs committee and their own offices, the five members were able to direct government policy both at home and abroad. The notion of an organised group in government, as opposed to a single royal favourite holding clear power, was seen by many as a threat to the authority of the throne. Others saw it as subverting the power of the council or of Parliament, whilst Buckingham's close relationship with the king made the Cabal unpopular with some reformers. The title "Cabal" resulted from the perception that they had conspired in Clarendon's fall and prosecution, and in its increasingly secretive conduct of government, and was helped by the fact that the initial letters of their names could be arranged to form CABAL as an acronym. However, there were sharp ideological divisions among the five, ranging from the Parliamentary idealism of Ashley to the autocratic absolutism of Lauderdale.

Membership and rise 

Following the end of Clarendon Ministry in 1667, in a cloud of accusations of incompetence and corruption, the conduct of the government of Charles II fell to a loose coalition of energetic young ministers, the "Cabal".

The linchpin of the Cabal was probably George Villiers, Duke of Buckingham. Although he only held the household office of Master of the Horse, with responsibility for overseeing the King's travel arrangements, Buckingham was a long and close associate of King Charles II, having been practically raised together since they were children, during the close association of their fathers, Charles I and the first Duke of Buckingham, a relationship they consciously compared themselves to in adulthood, and might have replicated had the younger Buckingham possessed the skills of his father. Nonetheless, Buckingham was in constant contact with and a clear favourite of the king, and the centre of the Cabal's grip on power. Gilbert Burnet, who knew some of its members personally, said that Buckingham stood somewhat apart from the rest of the Cabal, hating them and being hated in return.

The Lord High Treasurer Wriothesley having died just before Clarendon's departure, the Treasury went into commission in 1667, under the nominal chairmanship of George Monck (Duke of Albemarle). But as Monck was practically retired from public life, control of the Treasury commission was taken up by Sir Thomas Clifford (Comptroller and soon Treasurer of the Household) and Anthony Ashley Cooper (Chancellor of the Exchequer). With the assistance of their close associates John Duncombe (Ashley's deputy at the Exchequer), Stephen Fox (the Paymaster of the Forces) and notably Sir George Downing, the highly capable secretary to the Treasury commission, Clifford and Ashley overhauled the monarchical finances, placing them in a much more solvent state than before.

Foreign affairs was principally directed by Henry Bennet, Earl of Arlington (Secretary of the South), with occasional assistance from George Villiers, Duke of Buckingham. (Although foreign affairs were notionally in the purview of the Secretary of the North, the Cabal bullied Sir William Morice into selling the seat to Sir John Trevor, and then sidelined the latter.)

John Maitland, Earl of Lauderdale (Secretary of State for Scotland) had already consolidated his position in 1663 by securing the dismissal of his principal rival, John Middleton (Lord High Commissioner to the Parliament of Scotland) and his replacement by the more pliable John Leslie, Earl of Rothes. In 1669, Lauderdale went one step further, and got Leslie dismissed and the Lord High Commissioner position for himself, consolidating his hold and ruling Scotland as a virtual autocrat for the remainder of his career.

Sir Orlando Bridgeman, the Royalist lawyer who had prosecuted the Regicides, and who took over Clarendon's duties as Lord Keeper of the Great Seal in 1667, was outside of this inner circle, although cooperative with their goals.

Despite their comparative energy and efficiency, the Cabal were a fractious and unpopular lot. Although perceived as a secretive and unsavoury junta, they rarely formed a united front, and their internal quarrels often spilled over into the public arena. J. P. Kenyon suggests that the King actually encouraged the Cabal members to quarrel, in the belief that this made them easier to control. They in turn never trusted him not to bring them down as he had brought down Clarendon, and as Kenyon remarks, they hardly dared turn their backs on him for fear of sudden dismissal. It was said that the King treated his ministers very much as he did his mistresses: "he used them,  but he was not in love with them, and was tied to them no more than they to him, which implies sufficient liberty on either side". Sir William Coventry, the Secretary to the Admiralty, resigned from office following a duel challenge from the Duke of Buckingham, and re-emerged in the House of Commons at the head of a group of MPs known as the "Country Party", which loudly opposed the Cabal and its policies. Causing poor relations with members of parliament, Charles II acceded to the Cabal's recommendation to prorogue parliament repeatedly, keeping it out of session for as long as he could, and leaving the Cabal to run the country on their own. In financial exigency (a pressing need to levy taxes), following the Great Stop of the Exchequer in 1672 and the outbreak of the Third Anglo-Dutch War, Charles was obliged to re-convene parliament in 1673 and the parliamentarians were bent on revenge.

Split and fall 
The Cabal began to split in 1672, particularly over the autocratic nature of the King's Royal Declaration of Indulgence, the financing of the Third Anglo-Dutch War, and Britain's relationship with France. Personal rivalries and a conflict over foreign policy between Buckingham and Arlington escalated. The Ministry became very unpopular, characterised by arbitrary rule; the public saw them as  "untrustworthy, venal and self-seeking, their eyes always on the main chance". Towards the end of the year, Ashley, now the Earl of Shaftesbury, became Lord Chancellor, leaving Treasury matters to Clifford and the Exchequer to Duncombe. He pressed publicly for greater reform of government, taking the side of the Opposition against his colleagues and the King. Clifford resigned over the in-fighting and retired from public life: as an open Roman Catholic he would, in any case, have been debarred by the Test Act of 1673 from holding office in the future. Shaftesbury was replaced by Viscount Osborne, soon to become Earl of Danby, in the summer of 1673, on the recommendation of Buckingham and Clifford. Danby immediately established his authority over the remaining members of the Cabal. Buckingham's feud with Arlington saw him leak the details of the Treaty of Dover and fall from favour in 1674. Arlington survived as Southern Secretary until September of that year. Lauderdale retained his position and his relatively autonomous power in Scotland, becoming an enemy of Shaftesbury. Shaftesbury began to agitate against Charles and his brother, the Duke of York, later James II; he briefly returned to government in the Privy Council Ministry and took a lead in forming the partisan group that would eventually become known as the Whigs.

The Cabal was later called by Lord Macauley, British historian and Whig politician, "the first germ of the present system of government by a Cabinet".

Ministry 
These five members made up the "cabal" (Clifford, Arlington, Buckingham, Ashley, Lauderdale), which held most of the power within the government.

The remaining members of the ministry, as would be expected, held less power than the cabal.

References 

English ministries
Political history of England
1660s in England
1668 establishments in England
1670s disestablishments in England
1670s in England
Ministries of Charles II of England
Restorations (politics)